A national football centre (NFC) (or soccer institute) is the facilities that host an education base for a national football association.

The Canadian Soccer Association has a series of "national training centres" in each province where prospective football players are invited to be coached by professional coaches.

The Football Association of England operates the St George's Park National Football Centre.

The French Football Federation has the acclaimed Clairefontaine institute and several other regional academies which attempt to locate the more talented players at an early age, other sites include:

 Centre Régional Accueil Formation de Liévin
 Centre Régional Technique Georges Favre
 Centre Technique Régional Henri Guérin
 CREPS Aix-en-Provence
 CREPS Bourgogne Dijon
 CREPS Plaine des Cafres
 CREPS Reims
 CREPS Vichy Auvergne

The German Football Association opened its new headquarters and central training campus in Frankfurt in June 2022.

References

Association football academies